"Love Out Loud" is a song written by Thom Schuyler, and recorded by American country music artist Earl Thomas Conley.  It was released in March 1989 as the fourth single from the album The Heart of It All.  The song was Conley's eighteenth and final number one on the country chart as a solo artist.  The single went to number one for one week and spent fifteen weeks on the country chart.

Cover versions
It was covered in 2016 by Lorrie Morgan on her album Letting Go...Slow.

Chart performance
"Love Out Loud" debuted on the U.S. Billboard Hot Country Singles & Tracks for the week of March 18, 1989.

Year-end charts

References

1989 singles
Earl Thomas Conley songs
Lorrie Morgan songs
Songs written by Thom Schuyler
Song recordings produced by Emory Gordy Jr.
RCA Records singles
1989 songs